The following squads and players competed in the women's handball tournament at the 2000 Summer Olympics.

Angola
The following players represented Angola:

 Anica Neto
 Domingas Cordeiro
 Lili Webba-Torres
 Filomena Trindade
 Ilda Bengue
 Ivone Mufuca
 Justina Praça
 Marcelina Kiala
 Maria Inês Jololo
 Odete Tavares
 Maura Faial
 Regina Camumbila
 Teresa Ulundo

Australia
The following players represented Australia:

 Fiona Robinson-Hannan
 Jana Jamnicky
 Janni Bach
 Jovana Milosevic
 Katrina Shinfield
 Kim Briggs
 Lydia Kahmke
 Mari Edland
 Marina Kopcalic
 Petra Besta
 Raelene Boulton
 Rina Bjarnason
 Sarah Hammond
 Shelley Ormes
 Vera Ignjatovic

Austria
The following players represented Austria:

 Ausra Fridrikas
 Barbara Strass
 Doris Meltzer
 Iris Morhammer
 Laura Fritz
 Natalia Rusnatchenko
 Sorina Teodorovic
 Stanka Bozovic
 Steffi Ofenböck
 Svetlana Mugoša-Antić
 Tanja Logvin
 Tatjana Dschandschgawa
 Birgit Engl
 Ariane Maier
 Rima Sypkus

Brazil
The following players represented Brazil:

 Alessandra Medeiros da Oliveira
 Aline Silva
 Chana Masson
 Dilane Roese
 Idalina Mesquita
 Lucila Vianna da Silva
 Meg Montão
 Margarida Conte
 Maria José Batista de Sales
 Rosana de Aleluia
 Sandra de Oliveira
 Valéria de Oliveira
 Viviane Jacques
 Viviani Emerick

Denmark
The following players represented Denmark:

Head coach: Jan Pytlick

France
The following players represented France:

 Christelle Joseph-Mathieu
 Sonia Cendier Ajaguin
 Isabelle Wendling
 Joanne Dudziak
 Laïsa Lerus
 Leïla Lejeune-Duchemann
 Myriam Korfanty
 Nathalie Selambarom
 Nodjialem Myaro
 Raphaëlle Tervel
 Sandrine Delerce
 Stéphanie Cano
 Stéphanie Ludwig
 Valérie Nicolas
 Véronique Pecqueux-Rolland

Hungary
The following players represented Hungary:

 Beatrix Balogh
 Rita Deli
 Ágnes Farkas
 Andrea Farkas
 Anikó Kántor
 Beatrix Kökény
 Anita Kulcsár
 Dóra Lőwy
 Anikó Nagy
 Ildikó Pádár
 Katalin Pálinger
 Krisztina Pigniczki
 Bojana Radulovics
 Judith Simics
 Beáta Siti

Norway
The following players represented Norway:

 Kristine Duvholt
 Trine Haltvik
 Heidi Tjugum
 Susann Goksør Bjerkrheim
 Ann Cathrin Eriksen
 Kjersti Grini
 Elisabeth Hilmo
 Mia Hundvin
 Tonje Larsen
 Cecilie Leganger
 Jeanette Nilsen
 Marianne Rokne
 Birgitte Sættem
 Monica Sandve
 Else-Marthe Sørlie

Romania
The following players represented Romania:

 Aurelia Stoica
 Valeria Motogna-Beșe
 Cristina Vărzaru
 Cristina Dogaru-Cucuian
 Elena Napăr
 Gabriela Doina Tănaşe
 Lidia Drăgănescu
 Luminită Huţupan-Dinu
 Mihaela Ignat
 Nicoleta Alina Dobrin
 Ramona Farcău
 Steluța Luca
 Talida Tolnai
 Victorina Bora

South Korea
The following players represented South Korea:

 Choi Hyeon-jeong
 Jeong Eun-hui
 Han Seon-hui
 Heo Sun-yeong
 Heo Yeong-suk
 Kim Hyang-gi
 Kim Hyeon-ok
 Kim Jin-sun
 Lee Jeong-yeong
 Lee Nam-su
 Lee Sang-eun
 Mun Gyeong-ha
 Oh Seong-ok
 Oh Yeong-ran
 Park Jeong-hui

References

2000